Kalinga Ratna Award is an education award  established the  since 2007. It is awarded annually to a qualified Odisha person who has made a significant contribution to any field at the national/international level.

Recipients
 Biswabhusan Harichandan

References

Indian awards